The Detention Falls, a cascade waterfall on the Detention River, is located at Milabena in North West Tasmania, Australia.

Location and description
The falls are situated about 20 km west of Wynyard, approximately 220 m above sea level, and are located within the 3.29 km2 Detention Falls Conservation Area at Milabena. The Detention River, its headwaters forming within the Dip Ranges, flows for about 23 km before discharging into Bass Strait. The river mouth is adjacent to the small communities of Detention and Hellyer, near Rocky Cape.

At the point of the falls, the river forms a narrow channel through the quartzite rock above, before cascading onto a series of irregular steps, into a basin within the small gorge below.

Public access
The viewing platform and walking track was closed to the public following engineering advice in 2008, and the platform was subsequently removed. A hazard sign at the start of the walking track advises that the viewing area is unsafe and may collapse.

Gallery

See also

List of waterfalls of Tasmania
Protected areas of Tasmania

References

External links
Parks & Wildlife Service Tasmania

Waterfalls of Tasmania
North West Tasmania